Palomas may refer to:

Places
 Palomas (Madrid), a ward of the Hortaleza district, Madrid, Spain
 Palomas, Arizona, a community in the United States
 Palomas, Badajoz, Spain, a town
 Palomas, Comerío, Puerto Rico, a barrio in Comerío, a municipality of Puerto Rico (U.S.)
 Palomas (Mexibús, Line 1), a BRT station in Ecatepec de Morelos
 Palomas (Mexibús, Line 4), a BRT station in Ecatepec de Morelos
 Las Palomas, New Mexico, a community in the United States
 Puerto Palomas, Chihuahua, Mexico, a small town also known as simply Palomas

Other uses
 "La Paloma", a popular Spanish song
 Hurricane Paloma, 2008 hurricane in the Atlantic ocean
 USS Palomas (IX-91), a U.S. Navy schooner

See also
 Isla de Las Palomas, a Spanish island
 
 Paloma (disambiguation)